"Lotus"  is a song by American rock band R.E.M., released as the second single from their eleventh studio album, Up (1998). The song is somewhat minimalist, with Michael Stipe singing surreal lyrics in a percussive manner. It builds on a four-note keyboard part, with a distorted guitar riff at the beginning and after the second chorus. The song's recurring line "I ate the lotus" appeared in an alternate form ("I'll eat the lotus...") in a previous R.E.M. song, "Be Mine". The line "dot dot dot and I feel fine" is a reference to R.E.M.'s 1987 hit "It's the End of the World as We Know It (And I Feel Fine)".

For live performances of the song, Peter Buck alternates between electric guitar (chorus) and keyboard (verse). "Playing keyboard always excites me," Buck explained in a soundbite during MTV Uplink, a recording of the band's performance at New York's Bowery Ballroom in October 1998, "even though it's only with one finger." "But it's a big finger," joked Mills. "It's great."

Music video
The single's video, directed by Stéphane Sednaoui, was included as a bonus video on the DVD release of In View - The Best of R.E.M. 1988-2003. "I wanted to work with Stephane for a long time," Stipe explained to MTV UK during An Hour with R.E.M. in 2001 after selecting the video for airplay. "Since I saw the video that he did with Björk for, what was that called, "Big Time Sexuality" or something? Where she looks exactly like Shirley MacLaine, 1959-1961. The Apartment, I think, was the name of the film. Shirley McLaine and Björk as Shirley MacLaine on the back of a pick-up truck driving down 5th Avenue in New York City, probably. But I thought this guy exudes sex, he's like sex on a stick, and I wanted to work with him for that reason. He somehow transmogrified that very thing through me. I look very, very foxy in this video, which is why I chose it; it shows off my incredible stomach muscles."

Track listings
All songs were written by Peter Buck, Mike Mills, and Michael Stipe unless otherwise indicated.

CD
 "Lotus" - 4:31
 "Surfing the Ganges" – 2:25
 "Lotus" (Weird Mix) – 4:33

7-inch and cassette
 "Lotus" – 4:31
 "Surfing the Ganges" – 2:25

UK 3-inch CD
 "Lotus" – 4:31
 "Suspicion" (live in the studio) – 5:39
 This version of "Suspicion" is different from the Ealing Studio recording found on the "Suspicion" single.

Charts

Release history

References

External links
 

R.E.M. songs
1998 singles
Music videos directed by Stéphane Sednaoui
Number-one singles in Iceland
Songs about drugs
Songs written by Michael Stipe
Songs written by Mike Mills
Songs written by Peter Buck
Song recordings produced by Michael Stipe
Song recordings produced by Mike Mills
Song recordings produced by Pat McCarthy (record producer)
Song recordings produced by Peter Buck
Warner Records singles